Tetrapyrgos is a genus of fungi in the mushroom family Marasmiaceae. The genus has a widespread distribution and contains 16 species.

Species

See also

List of Marasmiaceae genera

References

External links

Marasmiaceae
Agaricales genera
Taxa named by Egon Horak